Zilair (Yılayır) is a rural locality (a selo) and the administrative center of Zilairsky District in the Republic of Bashkortostan, Russia. Population:

Climate

References

Rural localities in Zilairsky District